Nersisyan is an Armenian surname. Notable people with the surname include:

 Anni Nersisyan,  Armenian footballer
 Arsen Nersisyan (born 1987), Armenian alpine skier
 Hrachia Nersisyan (1895–1961), Soviet-Armenian film actor

See also 
 Nersessian

Armenian-language surnames